İlker Yağcıoğlu (born 10 March 1966) is a retired Turkish football midfielder and later manager.

References

1966 births
Living people
Turkish footballers
Sakaryaspor footballers
Aydınspor footballers
Fenerbahçe S.K. footballers
Kocaelispor footballers
Sarıyer S.K. footballers
İstanbulspor footballers
Association football midfielders
Turkey international footballers
Turkish football managers
Sakaryaspor managers
Sarıyer S.K. managers